Jay Xiong (born 1983) is an American politician serving in the Minnesota House of Representatives since 2019. A member of the Minnesota Democratic–Farmer–Labor Party (DFL), Xiong represents District 67B, which includes parts of Saint Paul in Ramsey County, Minnesota.

Early life, education, and career
Xiong attended Saint Paul Public Schools and graduated from St. Olaf College.

Xiong is a co-founder of the Asian American Organizing Project (AAOP) and Progressive Hmong American Organizers (PHAO).

Minnesota House of Representatives
Xiong was elected to the Minnesota House of Representatives in 2018, to represent House District 67B, on St. Paul's lower east side. He replaced Sheldon Johnson, who retired after serving 18 years. Xiong received the DFL endorsement after three rounds of balloting, leading by a wide margin each time against Shoua Yang, John Slade, and Grant Stevensen. He is the first person of color to hold the seat in the majority-minority district. 

Xiong serves as chair of the Workforce Development Finance and Policy Committee, and sits on the Capital Investment and Economic Development Finance and Policy Committees.

Electoral history

Personal life
Xiong lives with his spouse and children in St. Paul's Battle Creek neighborhood.

References

External links

 Official House of Representatives website
 Official campaign website

1980s births
Living people
Politicians from Saint Paul, Minnesota
St. Olaf College alumni
Democratic Party members of the Minnesota House of Representatives
21st-century American politicians
American politicians of Hmong descent
Asian-American people in Minnesota politics